The 1996 Stella Artois Championships was a men's tennis tournament played on grass courts at the Queen's Club in London in the United Kingdom and was part of the World Series of the 1996 ATP Tour. It was the 94th edition of the tournament and was held from 10 June through 16 June 1996. Boris Becker won the singles title.

Finals

Singles

 Boris Becker defeated  Stefan Edberg 6–4, 7–6(7–3)
 It was Becker's 2nd title of the year and the 61st of his career.

Doubles

 Todd Woodbridge /  Mark Woodforde defeated  Sébastien Lareau /  Alex O'Brien 6–3, 7–6
 It was Woodbridge's 7th title of the year and the 47th of his career. It was Woodforde's 8th title of the year and the 51st of his career.

References

External links
 Official website
 ATP tournament profile

 
Stella Artois Championships
Queen's Club Championships
1996 in English tennis
1996 sports events in London
June 1996 sports events in Europe